In molecular biology, glycoside hydrolase family 26 is a family of glycoside hydrolases.

Glycoside hydrolases  are a widespread group of enzymes that hydrolyse the glycosidic bond between two or more carbohydrates, or between a carbohydrate and a non-carbohydrate moiety. A classification system for glycoside hydrolases, based on sequence similarity, has led to the definition of >100 different families. This classification is available on the CAZy web site, and also discussed at CAZypedia, an online encyclopedia of carbohydrate active enzymes.

Glycoside hydrolase family 26 CAZY GH_26 comprises enzymes with two known activities; mannanase and β-1,3-xylanase.

Family 26 encompasses mainly mannan endo-1,4-beta-mannosidases. Mannan endo-1,4-beta-mannosidase hydrolyses mannan and galactomannan, but displays little activity towards other plant cell wall polysaccharides. The enzyme randomly hydrolyses 1,4-beta-D-linkages in mannans, galacto-mannans, glucomannans and galactoglucomannans.

References 

EC 3.2.1
GH family
Protein families